Unholy Alliance may refer to:
 Unholy alliance (geopolitical), when political antagonists temporarily join together to fight a common enemy
 The Unholy Alliance (professional wrestling), an Extreme Championship Wrestling tag team
 The Unholy Alliance Tour, an annual heavy metal tour
 The Unholy Alliance (TV series), a 2017 Hong Kong television drama
 "Unholy Alliance", Parts One and Two, episodes of Highlander: The Series

Literature 
 Unholy Alliance, a book by David Yallop
 Unholy Alliance: A History of Nazi Involvement with the Occult, a book by Peter Levenda
 Unholy Alliance: Radical Islam and the American Left, a book by David Horowitz
 Unholy Alliance: Religion and Atrocity in Our Time, a book by Marc H. Ellis.
 An Unholy Alliance, a novel by Susanna Gregory
 Unholy Alliance, a supervillain team from the comic book series Astro City

See also 
 Holy Alliance, an 1815 political coalition of Russia, Austria and Prussia
 Alliance (disambiguation)
 Unholy (disambiguation)